The Nainital wedding massacre was a mass murder that occurred during a wedding in Nainital, India on 21 April 1950, when a drunk Gurkha soldier stabbed 22 guests at a wedding, all of them apparently fatally.

The man, who was armed with a machete, was enraged by a low caste money lender marrying a girl of the higher social standing Brahmin caste, and stabbed the Harijan members. All of his victims were members of the Harijan caste.

See also
List of rampage killers in Asia

References

Mass murder in 1950
Massacres in India
1950 in India
Nainital
1950 murders in India
Mass stabbings in Asia
Attacks on weddings
Massacres in 1950
April 1950 events in Asia